Aschau is a municipality in the district of Mühldorf in Bavaria in Germany with about 3400 inhabitants (2020).

Notable people 
 Johannes Muschol (1949–1981); a member of the GDR border troops shot the German citizen as he jumped over the Berlin Wall into the death strip. 
 Joseph Ratzinger (1927-2022), Pope Benedict XVI, spent his elementary school years from 1932 to 1937 in Aschau am Inn.

References

Mühldorf (district)
Populated places on the Inn (river)